Line 11 of Qingdao Metro is a suburban metro line in Qingdao. The line runs from central Qingdao through Laoshan to the satellite district of Jimo. The line was opened on 23 April 2018.

Opening timeline

Stations

References

Qingdao Metro lines
Railway lines opened in 2018
2018 establishments in China